The European Cybersecurity Competence Centre (ECCC), officially the European Cybersecurity Industrial, Technology and Research Competence Centre, is an executive agency of the European Union headquartered in Bucharest, Romania, tasked with funding and coordinating cybersecurity research projects. Plans for the introduction of the ECCC were first announced in 2018 by the European Commission and the regulation to establish the centre was published in 2021. The ECCC collaborates closely with the Network of National Coordination Centres (NCCs).

Organization
Although the organization of the ECCC is still being established, the planned administrative and governance structure includes:
 a Governing Board which provides strategic orientation and oversees ECCC activities
 an Executive Director who is the ECCC’s legal representative and is responsible for its day-to-day management
 a Strategic Advisory Group that ensures a comprehensive, ongoing and permanent dialogue between the Community and the Competence Centre.

References

External links 

 Regulation establishing the European Cybersecurity Industrial, Technology and Research Competence Centre and the Network of National Coordination Centres

Politics of the European Union
Information technology organizations based in Europe
Executive agencies of the European Commission
Organizations based in Bucharest
Organizations established in 2021
2021 establishments in Romania